PAI Partners is a French private equity firm based in Paris, France. It is one of the oldest firms in the sector, with its origins dating back to Paribas Affaires Industrielles, the historical principal investment activity of Paribas, which started operations in 1872.

PAI manages €25.4 billion of dedicated buyout funds. Since 1994, PAI has completed 65 LBO transactions in 11 European countries, representing over €48 billion in transaction value. PAI has 62 agents from 10 countries and teams in Paris, London, Luxembourg, Madrid, Milan, Munich, Stockholm and New York City.

History
PAI was formerly known as Paribas Affaires Industrielles, the historical principal investment activity of Paribas. PAI LBO Fund, established in 1998, was the first PAI investment vehicle managing third party capital. Prior to 1998, PAI invested exclusively on the balance sheet of BNP Paribas.

Paribas merged with Banque Nationale de Paris in 2000. In 1993, Amaury de Sèze joined Paribas Affaires Industrielles as chairman and chief executive officer. Under his leadership, PAI developed a strategy in private equity that capitalized on the team's familiarity with industrial sectors.

Paribas Affaires Industrielles led the €610 million buyout of Danone’s pasta and condiment unit in 1997, at that time the largest leveraged buyout ever completed in France. The following year, the firm finalized fundraising for its first third party investment fund, raising €650 million of investor commitments. PAI completed a full spinout from BNP in 2000 and the following year raised a new €1.8 billion private equity fund.

In September 2009, Lionel Zinsou became CEO and Chairman of the firm. In 2015, Michel Paris became CEO after Lionel Zinsou stepped down to become prime minister in Benin.

In March 2015, PAI raised its fifth LBO fund, PAI Europe VI, reaching €3.3 billion, above the initial target of €3 billion. In September 2017, PAI announced the raising of a seventh investment vehicle: PAI Europe VII. In March 2018, PAI closed their PAI Europe VII fund.

Investment funds

Funds 
Prior to 1998, PAI made investments via the Paribas Portfolio. The Paribas Portfolio was funded directly from Paribas’ balance sheet, largely unleveraged and comprising 51 investments, all of which have now been realised. Reflecting the broader investment remit of PAI at the time, it included control and non-control investments. Since 1998, PAI has raised five private equity funds, as detailed below:

Detailed investments

Historically, PAI managed Paribas's stakes in large food and consumer goods companies across Europe: Royal Canin (European leader in dry pet food), Diana Ingredients (natural food ingredients), Evialis (animal feed), Saupiquet (ready meals), LDC (premium poultry), Navidul (cured ham – Spain), SOS Arana (rice – Spain) and helped them consolidate their respective sector. In 2021 PAI completed its largest ever investment with the $3.3 billion acquisition of Tropicana, Naked and other North American juice brands from PepsiCo. Previous transactions in consumer goods and services, healthcare as well as general industrial companies are highlighted below:

PAI VI investments

PAI V investments

PAI IV investments

Previous investments 
 Amora Maille: Sauces and condiments; acquired from Danone in 1997 sold to Unilever in 1999
 Antargaz: Propane and butane provision; sold to UGI Corporation in 2004
 Carglass: vehicle glass repair and replacement group
 Elis SA: Textile rental, hygiene services
 Gerflor: PVC flooring
 Groupe Lapeyre: Distribution of construction material
 Ipsen: Pharmaceutical laboratory
 VIA-GTI (known as Keolis): Transport; acquired 1995 and sold in 1999 to SNCF
 Panzani-Lustucru: Pasta and pasta sauces; acquired in 1997 from Danone, sold to Puleva en 2005
 Point P: Construction material distributor;
 Provimi: Animal nutrition
 Royal Canin: Animal nutrition for dogs and cats, sold to Mars Incorporated in 2002
 SAUR: Water distribution, sanitation and waste management services
 Saeco: Coffee machine manufacturer
 Vivarte: Shoe and women wear retailer; sold in 2007 to Charterhouse Capital Partners
 William Saurin: Canned ready meals; sold to Financière Turenne Lafayette (FTL) in 2001
 Yoplait: 51% share: Fresh dairy products, sold to General Mills in 2011

Notes and references

External links

PAI partners BusinessWeek Profile
"Builder To Sell Water Unit." New York Times, November 16, 2004
Timmons, Heather, Private Equity Investors Are Reshaping the Landscape of European Business. The New York Times, May 5, 2005
IPH shareholders

 
Private equity firms of France
Companies based in Paris
Financial services companies established in 1998